Morning is an album by American pianist Kenny Drew recorded in 1975 and released on SteepleChase Records in 1976. The album was first issued on CD in 1987 with a slightly different cover. "An Evening in the Park" is about an early spring, peaceful bicycling through Copenhagen's Fælledparken, a park not far from Drew's home back then. "Morning" was originally written for three instruments, but in the studio Pedersen suggested that Drew and Philip Catherine should try it as a duo.

Track listing
All pieces composed by Kenny Drew, unless otherwise noted.

"An Evening in the Park" – 7:27
"Autumn Leaves" (Kosma, Mercer, Prevert) – 10:34
"Bossa Mood" – 7:11 Bonus track on CD
"Poor Brother's Blues" – 9:51  Bonus track on CD
"Morning" - (Per Carstens) – 9:18
"Isn't It Romantic?" (Hart, Rodgers) – 8:58

Personnel
Kenny Drew – piano
Niels-Henning Ørsted Pedersen – bass
Philip Catherine – guitar

References

SteepleChase Records albums
Kenny Drew albums
1976 albums